The 2005 Zarand earthquake affected several villages in the Kerman province of Iran on February 22 at . The shock measured 6.4 on the moment magnitude scale and had a maximum Mercalli intensity of VIII (Severe). Zarand is located 740 km southeast of Tehran.  The maximum recorded peak ground acceleration was 0.51 g at Shirinrud dam. The United States' National Earthquake Information Center and the Belgian' Centre for Research on the Epidemiology of Disasters both show that 612 died and 1,411 were injured in the event.

Damage and casualties
Four villages,  each having around 1,000 inhabitants, were reported completely destroyed, and 30% to 70% of buildings in more than 40 villages were reported damaged. It is estimated that the population of the affected area exceeds 30,000. A great portion of population of several villages are severely affected because of poor condition of buildings. The epicenter of the quake was in a mountainous and sparsely inhabited area. It is believed that the death toll could have been much higher if the quake had stricken a more densely populated area like Bam.

Previous events
The region of Zarand is close to an active fault, known as the Kuhbanan fault in the north east of the city. Its trend is northwest-southeast and its length is 160 km. Zarand has been hit by several quakes in the last 70 years, with the oldest recorded one going back to 1933. On December 21, 1977, the area was hit by a 6.2-magnitude earthquake leaving 521 dead and 3 villages completely destroyed. On December 26, 2003, another devastating earthquake happened in Bam, 200 km southwest of Zarand, which is in the same province.

See also
List of earthquakes in 2005
List of earthquakes in Iran

References

External links

International Federation of Red Cross and Red Crescent bulletins on Zarand earthquake (PDF files): No.1, No.2, No.3, and No.4.
M6.4 - central Iran – United States Geological Survey
Earthquake Near Zarand, Iran – NASA Earth Observatory
Hundreds killed in Iranian quake – BBC News
Race to reach Iran quake victims – BBC News
Rain slows Iran quake aid effort – BBC News
'No-one knew what to do' – BBC News
Brief characteristics of Active faults in Kerman Province – National Geoscience Database of Iran

2005 disasters in Iran
Zarand earthquake
Zarand earthquake
Earthquakes in Iran
February 2005 events in Asia
Kerman Province